Victor was a steam-powered tugboat built in 1893 in Tacoma, Washington.  This vessel should not be confused with the similarly named Victor II, also active in Puget Sound.

Career
Victor was active in  Puget Sound and was operated, at least for a time, by the Hunt Brothers, a family of steamboat owners and operators.  As of the year 1900, the vessel was employed on the route from Tacoma to Gig Harbor in southern Puget Sound.  At some point the vessel was converted to diesel power.

See also 
Puget Sound Mosquito Fleet

References
 Kline, M.S. and Bayless, G.A., Ferryboats -- A Legend on Puget Sound, Bayless Books, Seattle, WA 1983 
 Newell, Gordon, Ships of the Inland Sea, Binford and Mort, Portland, OR (2nd Ed. 1960)
 Newell, Gordon, and Williamson, Joe, Pacific Steamboats, Bonanza Books, New York, NY (1963)

1893 ships
Steamboats of Washington (state)
Propeller-driven steamboats of Washington (state)
Tugboats of the United States
Ships built in Tacoma, Washington